The 1975 NCAA Division III basketball tournament was the first annual single-elimination tournament to determine the men's collegiate basketball national champion of National Collegiate Athletic Association (NCAA) Division III. The tournament field included 30 teams and took place during March 1975, with the national championship rounds taking place in Reading, Pennsylvania.

LeMoyne–Owen defeated Glassboro State, 57–54, to win their first national championship.

Regional Rounds

Regional No. 1

Regional No. 2

Regional No. 3

Regional No. 4

Regional No. 5

Regional No. 6

Regional Midwest - Waverly, Iowa

Regional No. 8

Championship Rounds
 Site: Reading, Pennsylvania

See also
1975 NCAA Division I basketball tournament
1975 NCAA Division II basketball tournament
1975 NAIA Basketball Tournament

References

NCAA Division III men's basketball tournament
Ncaa Tournament
NCAA Division III men's basketball tournament
NCAA Division III basketball tournament